The 2018 UNCAF Women's Interclub Championship was the third edition of the UNCAF Women's Club Championship, Central America's premier women's club football organized by UNCAF. The tournament was played in Panama City, Panama between 24 and 29 September 2018.

Moravia from Costa Rica are the two-time defending champions. All games were 70 minutes in duration.

Teams
For the first time, all seven UNCAF associations entered the tournament, with each association entering one team.

Venues
All matches were played at the Estadio Maracaná in Panama City.

Group stage
The seven teams were divided into two groups: one group of four teams and one group of three teams. The group winners and runners-up advance to the semi-finals.

All times were local, EST (UTC−5).

Group A

Group B

Knockout stage

Bracket

Semi-finals

Third place match

Final

References

External links
Fútbol Femenino – Torneo Interclubes, UNCAFut.com

2018
2018 in women's association football
2018 in Central American football
2018 in Panamanian sport
September 2018 sports events in North America
International association football competitions hosted by Panama